Ubuntu is the second studio album by Colombian group Piso 21. It was released on May 11, 2018 through Warner Music Latina.It is the most successful album of the band being Sky the general producer the production.

The album is characterized by the consolidation of the group based on its new urban style, while retaining its romantic essence as it was on their first album. There is a fusion with other rhythms such as trap and the use of African, folk and urban music as variety.

Was supported by eight singles: "Me Llamas", "Besándote", "Déjala Que Vuelva", "Tu Héroe", "Adrenalina", "Te Amo", "La Vida Sin Ti" and "Puntos Suspensivo". It is the last album by the group to fully have Juan David Castaño (El Llane) as lead vocalist.The special guests of Manuel Turizo, Paulo Londra, Maikel Delacalle, Fonseca, Zion & Lennox and Xantos are included.

Promotion

Singles 
On 8 July 2016, the album's lead single, "Me Llamas", was released digitally on music stores and streaming services. A notable remix of the song featuring fellow Colombian singer Maluma was released on 2 December 2016. The song peaked at number 32 on the Billboard Hot Latin Songs chart. Where it became the group's first charting single on the chart. The song peaked in the top ten of various Monitor Latino charts in Latin America.

"Besándote" was released digitally on music stores and streaming services on 21 April 2017, as the album's second single. A notable remix featuring British singer Anne-Marie was released on 1 September 2017. The song peaked at number 24 on the Billboard Latin Pop Songs chart. The song peaked in the top ten of various Monitor Latino charts in Latin America.

"Déjala Que Vuelva" was released digitally on music stores and streaming services on 19 October 2017, as the album's third single. The song peaked at number 16 on the US Hot Latin Songs chart. It also notably peaked at number one on the Billboard Tropical Songs chart where it became their first number one on any Billboard chart. The song peaked in the top ten of various Monitor Latino charts in Latin America.

"Tu Héroe" was released digitally on music stores and streaming services on 10 November 2017, as the album's fourth single. The song peaked at number seven on the Paraguayan Monitor Latino charts.

"Adrenalina" was released digitally on music stores and streaming services on 1 December 2017, as the album's fifth single.

"Te Amo" was released digitally on music stores and streaming services on 15 March 2018, as the album's sixth single. The song peaked in the top ten of various Monitor Latino charts in Latin America.

"La Vida Sin Ti" was released alongside the album digitally on music store and to streaming services on 11 May 2018, as the album's seventh single The song peaked at number 44 on the US Hot Latin Songs chart.

"Puntos Suspensivos" was released on 14 September 2018, as the album's eighth single. The song peaked within top 40 of several Latin charts.

Track listing
Songwriting credits taken from Tidal

Charts

Weekly charts

Year-end charts

Certifications

Release history

References

2018 albums
Piso 21 albums
Warner Music Latina albums
Spanish-language albums